Premna schliebenii is a species of plant in the family Lamiaceae. It is found in Mozambique and Tanzania.

References

schliebenii
Vulnerable plants
Taxonomy articles created by Polbot